Timuçin Esen (born 14 August 1973) is a Turkish actor.

Biography 
Timuçin Esen was born on 14 August 1973 in Adana to lawyer parents. After studying at TED Ankara College, he went to study theatre at Ankara University state conservatory and ultimately  graduated from Mimar Sinan Fine Arts University. He then went to the California Institute of the Arts in the United States to do his master's degree. He received coaching from acting teacher Larry Moss.

After returning to Turkey, he played in the series Gurbet Kadını. Esen starred in the film Gönül Yarası for which he won both a Golden Orange and a SİYAD award.

Filmography
Films
Gönül Yarası (2005)
Labirent (2011)
Seaburners (2012)
Senin Hikayen (2013)
 Martıların Efendisi (2017)
Müslüm (2018)

TV series
Gurbet Kadını (2003–2005)
Hırsız Polis (2005–2007)
Vicdan (2013–2014)
Gönül İşleri (2014–2015)
Bodrum Masalı (2016–2017)
Gülperi (2018–2019)
Hekimoğlu (2019–2021)
Web series
Ben Gri (2022)

References

External links 
 
 Official Website 
 Official Facebook Page

1973 births
Living people
People from Adana
Turkish male film actors
Turkish male stage actors
Turkish male television actors
Ankara University alumni
Golden Butterfly Award winners